Atlético Huila Femenino is a women's football club based in Neiva, Huila, Colombia. Founded in 2016, they are the women's section of Atlético Huila and take part in the Colombian Women's Football League organized by Dimayor, the top level women's football league in Colombia.

Atlético Huila won the league championship in 2018, having finished runner-up in the previous season. They also won the 2018 edition of the Copa Libertadores Femenina, thus becoming the first Colombian team to be champions of the club competition.

History
Atlético Huila Femenino was formed in 2016. The División Mayor del Fútbol Profesional Colombiano (Dimayor) announced in early 2016 that there would be a professional women's football league in Colombia. However, it was not until 20 October of the same year that the official launch of the championship took place in Cartagena. Atlético Huila Femenino was officially presented in October 2016 in the city of Neiva. The club agreed to the dispute of the Colombian professional league by making use of its right to participate thanks to having sports recognition from Coldeportes and Dimayor. Their objective was to be the first champion and the team created their bases from a mini championship in the Huila Department.

In the middle of the year, Mildrey Pineda, was called up by the Colombian national team and played in the 2016 Olympic Games in Rio de Janeiro.

The team entered a hiatus starting from 2020, when it withdrew from the domestic league owing to financial reasons. However, they returned to the league for the 2022 season.

Honours
Liga Femenina Profesional:
Winners (1): 2018
Copa Libertadores Femenina:
Winners (1): 2018

2018 Copa Libertadores Femenina Champions

Squad

1 GK  Maritza López
2 MF  Nancy Madrid
3 DF  Eliana Stábile
4 DF  Alexandra Canaguacán
5 DF  Carmen Rodallega
6 DF  Levis Ramos
8 MF  Liana Salazar
9 FW  Ysaura Viso
10 MF  Yoreli Rincón
11 FW  Nelly Córdoba
12 FW  Lucía Martelli
13 DF  Gavy Santos (c)
14 MF  Darnelly Quintero
15 DF  Daniela Caracas
16 FW  Jennifer Peñaloza
17 DF  Jaylis Oliveros
18 GK  Daniela Solera
19 MF  Fabiana Vallejos
20 DF  Aldana Cometti

Manager  Albeiro Erazo

Matches

Atlético Huila won the tournament. For being champions of the Copa Libertadores Femenina, Atlético Huila won $55,000. Every player received $2,000 and the rest of the money went to the team.

References

Atlético Huila
Women's football clubs in Colombia
Association football clubs established in 2016
2016 establishments in Colombia